Miroslav "Mirko" Votava (born 25 April 1956) is a German retired footballer and manager.

A defensive midfielder of stamina and tactical awareness, he played 546 matches in the Bundesliga (fourth in the all-time list at the time of his retirement), retiring at the age of 41. Most of his professional career was spent in with Werder Bremen, with which he won a total of five titles – he also played eight years with Borussia Dortmund and spent three seasons outside German football with Atlético Madrid.

Votava represented West Germany at Euro 1980.

Club career

Borussia and Atlético
Born in Prague, Czechoslovakia, Votava started learning his football trade at local FK Dukla. However, his parents left the country during the Prague Spring, settling first in Australia then West Germany, in Witten. He began playing professionally with Borussia Dortmund in 1974, with the club in the second division.

Scoring three goals in 22 games in his first Bundesliga season, Votava was an undisputed starter onwards, only missing three matches from 1977 to 1982, although he failed to win any silverware.

He subsequently moved to Atlético Madrid for 58 million pesetas, being an instrumental figure for the Colchoneros which always finished in the top four in La Liga during his three-year spell and also lifting the Copa del Rey in 1985.

Werder Bremen
Votava returned to West Germany aged 29, signing with SV Werder Bremen where he would play a further 11 campaigns and rarely missing a game. He helped the club to the 1991–92 edition of the UEFA Cup Winners' Cup and two league titles (to which he contributed with a total of 65 matches and five goals). On 24 August 1996, aged 40 years and 121 days, he became the league's oldest goalscorer at the time, scoring in a 2–1 loss at VfB Stuttgart; the record lasted until 16 February 2019, when Claudio Pizarro (aged 40 years and 136 days) scored against Hertha BSC.

As he was understandably slowing down, Votava left Bremen during the 1997 January transfer window, joining second-tier VfB Oldenburg and retiring at the season's end, with his team ranking last. Over a 23-year professional career, he was never sent off.

Votava then moved into coaching, starting with last club Oldenburg then moving to SV Meppen, both in the regional leagues. From late 2002 to early 2004, he took the reins of 1. FC Union Berlin in division two, following which he returned to Werder as a youth coach (he had previously worked with the club as a scout).

International career
Votava chose to represent West Germany internationally, and made his debut on 21 November 1979, playing 15 minutes in a 3–1 friendly away win over the Soviet Union. He appeared in a further four internationals, including UEFA Euro 1980's group stage match against Greece (0–0) as the national side emerged victorious in the tournament.

Honours
Atlético Madrid
Copa del Rey: 1984–85

Werder Bremen
Bundesliga: 1987–88, 1992–93
DFB-Pokal: 1990–91, 1993–94; Runner-up 1988–89, 1989–90
UEFA Cup Winners' Cup: 1991–92
DFL-Supercup: 1988, 1993, 1994

West Germany
UEFA European Championship: 1980

References

External links

1956 births
Living people
Czechoslovak emigrants to West Germany
Czechoslovak footballers
West German footballers
German footballers
Footballers from Prague
Association football midfielders
Bundesliga players
2. Bundesliga players
Borussia Dortmund players
SV Werder Bremen players
VfB Oldenburg players
La Liga players
Atlético Madrid footballers
Germany B international footballers
Germany international footballers
UEFA Euro 1980 players
UEFA European Championship-winning players
Czechoslovak expatriate footballers
West German expatriate footballers
Expatriate footballers in Spain
Czechoslovak expatriate sportspeople in Spain
West German expatriate sportspeople in Spain
German football managers
3. Liga managers
SV Meppen managers
1. FC Union Berlin managers
SV Werder Bremen II managers